Herald is an unincorporated community in Heralds Prairie Township, White County, Illinois, United States. Herald had a post office, which opened on September 13, 1886, and closed on April 10, 2004.

References

Unincorporated communities in White County, Illinois
Unincorporated communities in Illinois
Populated places established in 1886